Micromyrtus rubicalyx is a plant species of the family Myrtaceae endemic to Western Australia.

It blooms in September producing white flowers.

It is found on slopes in the Mid West region of Western Australia around the Chapman Valley are where it grows in clay to sandy loam soils over sandstone.

References

rubicalyx
Endemic flora of Western Australia
Myrtales of Australia
Rosids of Western Australia
Vulnerable flora of Australia
Plants described in 2010
Taxa named by Barbara Lynette Rye